Kozol is a surname. Notable people with this surname include:
Harry Kozol (1906–2008), American neurologist
Jonathan Kozol (born 1936), American writer, educator, and activist